Horribates is a genus of Eremobatid camel spiders, first described by Martin Hammond Muma in 1962.

Species 
, the World Solifugae Catalog accepts the following three species:

 Horribates bantai Muma, 1989 — US (California)
 Horribates minimus Muma, 1989 — US (California)
 Horribates spinigerus Muma, 1962 — US (California, Nevada)

References

Further reading

 
 
 
 
 
 
 

Solifugae
Articles created by Qbugbot